The Writers Guild of America Award for Television: Long Form – Adapted is an award presented by the Writers Guild of America to the writers of the best long form program based on the previously published material or work of the season. It has been awarded since the 50th Annual Writers Guild of America Awards in 1996.

Through the 70s and 80s, numerous categories were presented to recognize writing for long-form programs, some of them were for anthology series or limited series while others also included television films as "long form". The divisions between original and adapted were presented in some of the categories presented during these years, though not all of them.

Since the 39th Writers Guild of America Awards in 1976, two categories are presented to recognize the writing in long form television media, these two categories remain to this day and are: Long Form – Original and Long Form – Adapted.

Name history
 Best Anthology Adaptation (1979)
 Best Multi-Part Long Form Series and/or Any Production of More Than Two Parts (1978-1979)
 Best Adapted Drama Anthology (1082-1985)
 Best Original/Adapted Comedy Anthology (1984-1985)
 Best Original/Adapted Multi-Part Long Form Series (1984)
 Best Long Form - Adapted (1986-present)

Winners and nominees
The year indicates that each ceremony honored the programs of that year. Single winner of the year is left unmarked, while other winners which also have nominees are highlighted in gold and in bold.

1970s
Best Anthology Adaptation

Best Multi-Part Long Form Series and/or Any Production of More Than Two Parts

1980s
Best Adapted Drama Anthology

Best Original/Adapted Comedy Anthology

Best Original/Adapted Multi-Part Long Form Series

Best Long Form - Adapted

1990s
Best Long Form - Adapted

2000s

2010s

2020s

Notes

References

External links

Screenplay